Mahalaxmi is a municipality in Dhankuta District of Province No. 1 in Nepal. It is a municipality out of three urban municipalities in Dhankuta District. The municipality is divided into nine wards. The headquarter of the municipality is in Jitpur Bazar.

Demographics
At the time of the 2011 Nepal census, Mahalaxmi Municipality had a population of 24,800. Of these, 74.8% spoke Nepali, 10.4% Magar, 6.0% Yakkha, 3.0% Tamang, 2.7% Limbu, 1.7% Newar, 0.6% Rai, 0.2% Maithili and 0.6% other languages as their first language.

In terms of ethnicity/caste, 40.7% were Chhetri, 10.8% Magar, 6.6% Newar, 6.3% Hill Brahmin, 6.3% Yakkha, 6.0% Kami, 4.3% Gurung, 4.2% Tamang, 3.6% Damai/Dholi and 11.2% others.

In terms of religion, 75.8% were Hindu, 14.3% Buddhist, 8.6% Kirati, 1.1% Christian and 0.2% others.

References

External links
 www.madisankhuwasabhamun.gov.np

Populated places in Dhankuta District
Municipalities in Koshi Province
Nepal municipalities established in 2017